The 1994 Central Regional Council election, the sixth and final election to Central Regional Council, was held on 5 May 1994 as part of the wider 1994 Scottish regional elections. The election saw Labour hold their overall majority, taking 23 out of the 35 available seats.

Aggregate Results

Ward Results

References

1994 Scottish local elections
May 1994 events in the United Kingdom